The Integrated Humanities Program (IHP), also known as the Pearson integrated Humanities Program, was a program at the University of Kansas in the 1970s.  The program was dedicated to the instilling of wonder in and pursuit of truth with underclassmen.  It was led by three faculty: Dr. Dennis Quinn, Dr. John Senior, and Dr. Frank Nelick.

Academics and activities
In the words of Dennis Quinn, the program sought to "teach the Great Books, the classics, from the Greeks up through the Romans and through the Middle Ages and the Renaissance into the modern times.”  In addition to studying the great books, the students also got together for poetry memorization, singing folk songs, formal waltzing lessons, and stargazing, an activity the founders thought to be one of the greatest sources of wonder.

Controversy
After numerous conversions on the part of students to Catholicism and the subsequent publishing of an article on the part of the Kansas City Times newspaper depicting a Darwinian evolution of a hippie gradually becoming a Catholic monk, the university administration set up an investigation of the program to determine whether or not the three faculty were proselytizing.  Ultimately, the program was disbanded following the investigations, despite the investigation group having issued a statement saying "In the face of charges of religious indoctrination and proselytizing, the Committee has found no evidence that the professors of the program have engaged in such activities in the classroom."

Notable alumni
A number of Catholic leaders in America were formed in the program such as Bishop James Conley of the Diocese of Lincoln, Nebraska (who converted to Catholicism with Dr. Senior as his godfather), Archbishop Paul Coakley of the Archdiocese of Oklahoma City, Oklahoma, and Dom Philip Anderson, abbot of Our Lady Of The Annunciation of Clear Creek Abbey. A number of the founding monks of Clear Creek were students of John Senior and his legacy is remembered there on various occasions, a number of his works are available in their bookstore.

Dr. Robert Carlson, one of the three founders of Wyoming Catholic College, its first academic dean, and the author of its philosophical vision statement, also is an alumnus of the program.

Further reading

References 

University of Kansas
University programs